is a junction passenger railway station located in the city of Kōchi city, the capital of Kōchi Prefecture, Japan. It is operated by JR Shikoku and has the station number "D44".

Lines

Although  is the official western terminus of the third-sector Tosa Kuroshio Railway Asa Line (also known as the Gomen-Nahari Line), all its rapid and some local trains continue towards  on the Dosan Line tracks with Azōno as one of their intermediate stops.

Layout
The station, which is unstaffed, consists of two opposed side platforms serving two elevated tracks. A ramp leads up to the station from street level and a footbridge connects the platforms. Weather shelters are provided on both platforms.

Adjacent stations

|-
!colspan=5|JR Shikoku

|-
!colspan=5|Tosa Kuroshio Railway

History
The station was opened by Japanese National Railways (JNR) on 15 April 1952 as a new stop on the existing Dosan Line. With the privatization of JNR on 1 April 1987, control of the station passed to JR Shikoku.

Surrounding area
Mount Itagaki (Taisuke Itagaki Ancestral Cemetery)
Kakegawa Shrine

See also
 List of Railway Stations in Japan

References

External links

 [https://www.jr-shikoku.co.jp/01_trainbus/jikoku/pdf/azono.pdf JR Shikoku timetable

Railway stations in Kōchi Prefecture
Railway stations in Japan opened in 1952
Kōchi